This is a recap of the 1973 season for the Professional Bowlers Association (PBA) Tour.  It was the tour's 15th season, and consisted of 33 events. Don McCune amassed six victories during the year, winning PBA Player of the Year honors along the way. McCune became known on tour this season for chemically softening his bowling balls to give them extra hooking power. The practice, which was completely legal at the time, was soon followed by several other bowlers in what would later be dubbed "The Year of the Soaker". This eventually led to new ABC and PBA rules related to altering bowling ball surfaces, while prompting bowling ball manufacturers to develop new, softer cover stocks.

Mike McGrath continued to come up big in big tournaments. His win in the BPAA U.S. Open gave him three majors among his first eight titles. McGrath would pick up his ninth and tenth titles later in the season.

Jim Godman became the first two-time winner in the Firestone Tournament of Champions, as he had also won the event in 1969. Earl Anthony captured his seventh PBA title and first major at the PBA National Championship.

Tournament schedule

References

External links
1973 Season Schedule

Professional Bowlers Association seasons
1973 in bowling